Michael "Mike" Morhaime (born November 3, 1967) is an American video game developer and entrepreneur. He is the chief executive officer (CEO) and founder of Dreamhaven, located in Irvine, California. Morhaime is best known as the co-founder and the former president of Blizzard Entertainment, a subsidiary of Activision Blizzard, Inc., that was founded in 1991 as Silicon & Synapse. He served on the Vivendi Games executive committee since January 1999, when Blizzard Entertainment, Inc. became a subsidiary of Vivendi Games.

Early life and education
Morhaime was born into a Jewish family and graduated from Granada Hills High School in 1985. He is also an alumnus of Triangle Fraternity and received his bachelor's degree in Electrical Engineering in 1990 from the University of California, Los Angeles (UCLA).

In sixth grade, Morhaime, along with his brother and sister, purchased a video game console called the Bally Professional Arcade, first released in 1978. Morhaime discovered that the console was programmable, and he taught himself how to write simple games on it, building off of example programming code he found in a gaming newsletter.

As an electrical engineering student at UCLA, Morhaime focused more on hardware than on software. "I procrastinated a lot," he admitted. Things changed after he got an internship at a San Jose microchip company. In his internship there, he learned about circuit design, and when he returned to school he was ahead of his computer architecture class. "I used to be the guy that sat in the back," he said, but after his stint in Silicon Valley, he said, "I started sitting up front."

Career

Blizzard Entertainment
It was in that time period at UCLA that Morhaime met the two other people with whom he would create Silicon & Synapse, the company that would be renamed later as Blizzard Entertainment. The initial founders—Morhaime, Allen Adham and Frank Pearce—rented a small office in Irvine, California, where the proximity to other companies was hoped to be advantageous to them.

In 1995, Blizzard released Warcraft II, its first number one selling game. "It's probably the game that put Blizzard on the map," Morhaime said. Besides its large number of sales, "it was the first game you could play over the Internet with a good experience," which was a novelty at the time, as well as being a defining selling point for its later titles.

Blizzard's greatest success came with a hard but not unwelcome lesson. In planning for the release of World of Warcraft (WoW) in late 2004, Morhaime thought that the market for the much larger and more interactive new game—the first in their history to require players to pay a monthly subscription fee—would grow slowly and would be an unpopular surprise to the gaming community. "We felt it was very likely the fee would be a deterrent for people, and that WoW would not sell as quickly as some of our previous games," he said. All of Blizzard's production and marketing decisions were based on that assumption. To Blizzard's surprise (and very shortly later, terror) WoW sold extremely quickly, leaving the underprepared Blizzard unable to keep merchants supplied with the game for a short time. "For the whole first year, we scrambled to keep up with demand," he said. "It probably took years off of our lives." World of Warcraft had approximately 11 million subscribers as of 2010. In 2017, Morhaime earned $12.3 million as the CEO of Blizzard.

On October 3, 2018, Morhaime announced he was stepping down as the company president and CEO, instead becoming an advisor to the company. Morhaime was replaced by J. Allen Brack, the executive producer on World of Warcraft. His advisory role concluded on April 7, 2019.

Dreamhaven
In 2020, Mike Morhaime founded Dreamhaven, a new video game company. The company is based in Irvine, California, and has two game development studios called Secret Door and Moonshot Games. Dreamhaven, Inc. operates under Moonwell Studios LLC.

Honors and awards
In 2008, Morhaime was inducted into the Academy of Interactive Arts and Sciences' Hall of Fame. On the same year, Morhaime was honored at the 59th Annual Technology & Engineering Emmy Awards for Blizzard's creation of World of Warcraft. Along with Don Daglow of Stormfront Studios and John Carmack of id Software, Morhaime is one of only three designers or producers to accept awards at the Technology & Engineering Emmy Awards and at the Academy of Interactive Arts & Sciences Interactive Achievement Awards.

Morhaime received the national Ernst & Young Entrepreneur of the Year Award in the Technology category in 2012. In 2019, Morhaime was appointed the 2019 Honor Award at the Gamelab Barcelona, in Spain for his success in the gaming industry.

Multimedia
In 2012, Morhaime made a cameo appearance on The Guild, a web series about the lives of a gamers' online experiences with an MMORPG that draws references to World of Warcraft. He is known for his work with the gaming community, but also worked on the 2016 film Warcraft: The Beginning.

Personal life

In 2010, Morhaime married his long-time girlfriend Amy Chen. In 2017, Morhaime bought a mansion in a gated Rancho Mirage community in Riverside County, California for $2.25 million. He is a member of ETC, a metal band formed of and by Blizzard employees, where he plays bass guitar.

References

External links
 

1967 births
Living people
Blizzard Entertainment people
Academy of Interactive Arts & Sciences Hall of Fame inductees
Place of birth missing (living people)
20th-century American Jews
Video game businesspeople
21st-century American Jews